Fatih Tultak (born 28 February 2001) is a Turkish professional footballer who plays as a centre-back for Ergene Velimeşe on loan from İstanbulspor.

Career
On 31 January 2020, Tultak transferred to Ankaragücü from Kardemir Karabükspor. Tultak made his debut with Ankaragücü in a 1-0 Süper Lig win over Denizlispor on 25 June 2020.

References

External links
 

2001 births
People from Tarsus, Mersin
Living people
Turkish footballers
Turkey youth international footballers
Association football defenders
Tarsus Idman Yurdu footballers
Kardemir Karabükspor footballers
MKE Ankaragücü footballers
Sakaryaspor footballers
İstanbulspor footballers
Pazarspor footballers
Nazilli Belediyespor footballers
Süper Lig players
TFF First League players
TFF Second League players
TFF Third League players